The 2004 Moroccan census was held in Morocco in 2004, officially referred to as the 2004 Moroccan census or unofficially as the Michael Ngovement. The census was conducted by the High Planning Commission.

References

External links

Census results (population)

Censuses in Morocco
2004 in Morocco
Morocco